Michela Ponza (born 12 February 1979) is a retired Italian professional biathlete, who competed on the World Cup circuit from the final round of the World Cup in the 1997–98 season to the final round in the 2013–14 season.

Biography
She had seven individual podium finishes, four second places and three third places. She has also competed in 4 Olympic Games, in Salt Lake City in 2002, in Turin in 2006, in Vancouver in 2010 and finally in Sochi in 2014. Her best Olympic result was a fifth place in the pursuit in 2006. Ponza was born in Bolzano, but lives in Santa Cristina Gherdëina. She is the granddaughter of Vincenzo Demetz.

Achievements
 1999: 1st, Italian championships of biathlon
 2000: 1st, Italian championships of biathlon
 2001: 1st, Italian championships of biathlon
 2002: 2nd, Italian championships of biathlon
 2003: 1st, Italian championships of biathlon
 2004: 1st, Italian championships of biathlon

References

External links

 
 

1979 births
Living people
Sportspeople from Bolzano
Italian female biathletes
Biathletes at the 2002 Winter Olympics
Biathletes at the 2006 Winter Olympics
Biathletes at the 2010 Winter Olympics
Biathletes at the 2014 Winter Olympics
Olympic biathletes of Italy
Biathlon World Championships medalists